Samaria (Samareia; , as-Samira) was a city in the historical region of Samaria that served as the capital of the northern Kingdom of Israel during the 9th and 8th centuries BCE. Towards the end of the 8th century BCE, possibly in 722 BCE, Samaria was captured by the Neo-Assyrian Empire and became an administrative center under Assyrian, Babylonian, and Persian rule. During the early Roman period, the city was expanded and fortified by Herod the Great, who renamed it “Sebastia” in honor of emperor Augustus.

The ancient city's hill is where the modern Palestinian village of Sebastia, which retains its Roman name, is located. The archeological site, subject to a shared Israeli-Palestinian control, is located on the hill's eastern slope.

Etymology 
Samaria's biblical name, Šōmrōn (שֹׁמְרוֹן), means "watch" or "watchman" in Hebrew. The Bible derives the name from the individual (or clan) Shemer, from whom King Omri (ruled 880s–870s BCE) purchased the hill in order to build his new capital city.

In earlier cuneiform inscriptions, Samaria is referred to as "Bet Ḥumri" ("the house of Omri"); but in those of Tiglath-Pileser III (ruled 745–727 BCE) and later it is called Samirin, after its Aramaic name, Shamerayin. The city of Samaria gave its name to the mountains of Samaria, the central region of the Land of Israel, surrounding the city of Shechem. This usage probably began after the city became Omri's capital, but is first documented only after its conquest by Sargon II of Assyria, who turned the kingdom into the province of Samerina.

Location 
Samaria was situated north-west of Shechem, located close to a major road heading to the Sharon Plain on the coast and on another leading northward through the Jezreel Valley to Phoenicia. This location may be related to Omri's foreign policy. Strategically perched atop a steep hill, the city had a clear and good view of the nearby countryside.

History

Iron Age
In the 9th and the 8th centuries BCE, Samaria was the capital of the northern Kingdom of Israel. The earliest reference to a settlement at this location may be the town of Shemer, or Shamir, which according to the Hebrew Bible was the home of the judge Tola in the 12th century BC.

Archaeological evidence suggests a small rural settlement existed in Samaria during Iron Age I (11-10th centuries BCE); remains from this period are several rock-cut installations, several flimsy walls, and typical pottery forms. Stager suggested to identify these remains with biblical Shemer's estate. Remains from the early Iron Age II (IIA) are missing or unidentified; Franklin believes this phase consisted of merely an agricultural estate. A massive royal acropolis was built on the site during the late Iron Age II, including a casemate wall and a palatial complex considered one of the largest Iron Age structures in the Levant. 

According to Israel Finkelstein, the first palace at Samaria, probably built by Omri (884–873 BCE), marked the beginning of the northern Kingdom of Israel's transformation into a more complex kingdom. A later urban transformation of the capital and the kingdom, he believes, was characteristic of the more advanced phase of the Omride dynasty, probably occurring during the reign of Ahab (873–852 BCE). Finkelstein also suggested that the biblical narratives surrounding the northern Israelite kings were composed either in Samaria or Bethel. After the fall of Israel during the 8th century, this information was brought to Judah, and later found its way into the Hebrew Bible.

Towards the end of the 8th century BCE, possibly in 722 BCE, Samaria was captured by the Neo-Assyrian Empire and became an administrative center under Assyrian, Babylonian, and Persian rule.

Classical antiquity

Samaria was destroyed a second time by Alexander the Great in 331 BCE, and again by the Hasmonean king John Hyrcanus in 108 BCE.

The city was rebuilt by Herod the Great between the years 30–27 BCE. According to Josephus, Herod expanded and renovated the city, bringing in 6,000 new inhabitants, and renamed it "Sebastia" in the emperor's honor (translating the Latin epithet augustus to Greek sebastos, "venerable").

In the Bible
According to the Hebrew Bible, Omri, the king of the northern kingdom of Israel, purchased the hill from Shemer its owner for two talents of silver, and built on its broad summit the city to which he gave the name of Šōmrōn (i.e., Samaria), as the new capital of his kingdom, replacing Tirzah. As such it possessed many advantages. Omri resided here during the last six years of his reign.

Omri is thought to have granted the Arameans the right to "make streets in Samaria" as a sign of submission.

It was the only great city of Israel created by the sovereign. All the others had been already consecrated by patriarchal tradition or previous possession. But Samaria was the choice of Omri alone. He, indeed, gave to the city which he had built the name of its former owner, but its especial connection with himself as its founder is proved by the designation which it seems Samaria bears in Assyrian inscriptions, "Beth-Khumri" ("the house or palace of Omri"). (Stanley)

Samaria is frequently the subject of sieges in the biblical account. During the reign of Ahab, it says that Hadadezer of Aram-Damascus attacked it along with thirty-two vassal kings, but was defeated with a great slaughter. A year later, he attacked it again, but he was utterly routed once more, and was compelled to surrender to Ahab, whose army was no more than "two little flocks of kids" compared to that of Hadadezer. 

According to 2 Kings, Ben Hadad of Aram-Damascus laid siege to Samaria during the reign of Jehoram, but just when success seemed to be within his reach, his forces suddenly broke off the siege, alarmed by a mysterious noise of chariots and horses and a great army, and fled, abandoning their camp and all its contents. The starving inhabitants of the city feasted on the spoils from the camp. As the Prophet Elisha had predicted, "a measure of fine flour was sold for a shekel, and two measures of barley for a shekel, in the gates of Samaria".

Archaeology 

Samaria was first excavated by the Harvard Expedition, initially directed by Gottlieb Schumacher in 1908 and then by George Andrew Reisner in 1909 and 1910; with the assistance of architect C.S. Fisher and D.G. Lyon. Reisner's dig unearthed the Samaria Ostraca, a collection of 102 ostraca written in the Paleo-Hebrew Script.

A second expedition was known as the Joint Expedition, a consortium of 5 institutions directed by John Winter Crowfoot between 1931 and 1935; with the assistance of Kathleen Mary Kenyon, Eliezer Sukenik and G.M. Crowfoot. The leading institutions were the British School of Archaeology in Jerusalem, the Palestine Exploration Fund, and the Hebrew University.

A palace regarded as one of the largest Iron Age structures in the Levant was discovered during this excavation. Archeologists believe it was built during the 9th century BCE by the Omrides. The palace, constructed of massive roughly dressed blocks, is comparable in size and splendor to palaces built at the same period in northern Syria. It was surrounded by official administrative structures on the west and northeast. Six proto-Ionic capitals used as spolia discovered nearby may have originally adorned a monumental gateway to the palace. According to Norma Franklin, there is a possibility that the tombs of Omri and Ahab are located beneath the Iron Age palace.Excavations in the palace uncovered 500 pieces of carved ivory, portraying exotic animals and plants, mythological creatures, and foreign deities, among other things. Some scholars identified those with the "palace adorned with ivory" mentioned in the Bible. Some of the ivories are on display at the Israel Museum in Jerusalem and in other locations across the world.

In the 1960s, further small scale excavations directed by Fawzi Zayadine were carried out on behalf of the Department of Antiquities of Jordan.

Recent events 
In August 2022, it was reported that Palestinians lit the area on fire while using burning twigs to purportedly clean the area. The fire damaged the archeological site. According to the report, it's unclear whether this was done intentionally.

See also
Omrides
Tel Jezreel
Biblical archeology
Cities of the ancient Near East
List of modern names for biblical place names

References

Further reading

 Grayson, A.K. (1975). Assyrian and Babylonian Chronicles Texts from Cuneiform Sources 5. New York. pp 69–87.

Tappy, R. E. (1992). The Archaeology of Israelite Samaria: Vol. I, Early Iron Age through the Ninth Century BCE. Harvard Semitic Studies 44. Atlanta, GA: Scholars Press.

Tappy, R. E. (2001). The Archaeology of Israelite Samaria: Vol. II, The Eighth Century BCE. Harvard Semitic Studies 50. Winona Lake, IN: Eisenbrauns.

External links
Samaria (city), biblewalks

Archaeological sites in Samaria
Ruins in the State of Palestine
Populated places established in the 9th century BC
Kingdom of Israel (Samaria)
Omrides
Hebrew Bible cities